David Kalousek (born 13 May 1975 in Hradec Králové) is a Czech footballer who currently plays for Arka Gdynia.

References
 
 

1975 births
Living people
Czech footballers
Czech First League players
FC Hradec Králové players
Zagłębie Lubin players
Arka Gdynia players
Association football defenders
Sportspeople from Hradec Králové
Expatriate footballers in Poland
Czech expatriate sportspeople in Poland